The Chvojnica is a river in western Slovakia. It is a left tributary to the Morava, into which it flows near the town of Holíč. Its source is in the White Carpathians.

Etymology
The name comes from Slavic chvojъ, chvoja—tree branches. 1217 caput fontis Hoynicha.

References

Rivers of Slovakia